The following people have the surname Ensor:

 Abram G. Ensor (died 1959), American politician
 Arthur John Ensor (1905–1995), British-Canadian painter and industrial designer
 Beatrice Ensor (1885–1974), English theosophical educator and pedagogue
 David Ensor (journalist), American news reporter and former national security correspondent for CNN
 David Ensor (politician) (1906–1987), British lawyer, actor, author and Labour Party politician
 Ernest Ensor (1870–1929), English-born Irish cricketer
 George Ensor (1769–1843), Irish author and lawyer
 James Ensor (1860–1949), Belgian painter and printmaker
 Kathy Ensor, American statistician
 Lavelle Ensor (1900–1947), American jockey
 Patrick Ensor (1946–2007), British newspaper journalist
 Robert Ensor (1877–1958), British writer, poet and journalist
 Sidney Ensor, British Mayor of Thames
 Tony Ensor (rugby union, born 1949), Ireland rugby union player
 Tony Ensor (rugby union, born 1991), New Zealand rugby union player

Fictional
In the BBC TV sci-fi series Blake's 7, Ensor was the creator of the computer Orac

See also
 2819 Ensor, minor planet named after James Ensor
 Baddesley Ensor, English village
 Ensor Award, Belgian award named after James Ensor
 Ensor (crater), Mercury crater named after James Ensor
 French Ensor Chadwick